Crystal Lake is a lake straddling the boundary between the Rural Municipality (RM) of Keys No. 303 and the RM of Buchanan No. 304 in eastern Saskatchewan, Canada. It is surrounded by the residential resort community of Crystal Lake.

See also 
List of lakes of Saskatchewan

References

External links 

Lakes of Saskatchewan